Calvin Owen Harm Raatsie (born 9 February 2002) is a Dutch professional footballer who plays as a goalkeeper for Eredivisie club Utrecht.

Club career
A youth academy graduate of Ajax, Raatsie made his professional debut for club's reserve side Jong Ajax on 15 February 2021 in a 1–2 defeat against Dordrecht.

He made an appearance on the bench for the senior team, but was an unused substitute in a 3-1 win over VVV-Venlo on 13 May 2021.

On 27 May 2022, Raatsie signed a three-year contract with Utrecht.

International career
Raatsie is a current Dutch youth international. He has represented the Netherlands in four different age group teams from under-15 to under-18. He was first choice goalkeeper of under-17 team which won 2019 UEFA European Under-17 Championship. He also played all matches at 2019 FIFA U-17 World Cup, as Netherlands finished fourth in the tournament.

Career statistics

Honours
Netherlands U17
UEFA European Under-17 Championship: 2019

Individual
UEFA European Under-17 Championship Team of the Tournament: 2019

References

External links
 

2002 births
Living people
People from Purmerend
Dutch footballers
Netherlands youth international footballers
Association football goalkeepers
Jong Ajax players
FC Utrecht players
Eerste Divisie players
Footballers from North Holland